Moore may refer to:

People
 Moore (surname)
 List of people with surname Moore
 Moore Crosthwaite (1907–1989), a British diplomat and ambassador
 Moore Disney (1765–1846), a senior officer in the British Army
 Moore Powell (died c. 1573), a Welsh politician
 Gordon Moore, (1929-), co-founder of Intel, coined the term "Moore's Law"

Places

Australia 
Moore, Queensland, a town in the Somerset Region
Division of Moore, an electoral division in Western Australia

Greenland 
Moore Glacier

United Kingdom 
Moore, Cheshire, England

United States 
Moore, Idaho
Moore, Indiana
Moore, Montana
Moore, New Jersey
Moore, Oklahoma
Moore Township, Pennsylvania
Moore, South Carolina
Moore, Texas
Moore, Utah
Moore, Washington
Moore, West Virginia
Moore County, North Carolina
Moore County, Tennessee
Moore County, Texas
Moore Haven, Florida
 Banning, California, formerly known as Moore City

Schools

Australia 
 Moore Theological College, Sydney, Australia

United States 
Moore Catholic High School, in Staten Island, New York
Moore College of Art and Design, in Philadelphia
Moore Traditional High School, grades 6–12 school in Louisville, Kentucky

Other uses
 Moore (lunar crater)
 Moore's law, the empirical observation that the transistor density of integrated circuits doubles every two years
 Moore machine, finite state automaton where the outputs are determined by the current state alone in the theory of computation
 Moore 30, an American sailboat design
 Moore, Mooré, Mòoré and Mõõré, transliterations of the Mossi language's word for itself

See also

Moore Hall (disambiguation)
Mohr (disambiguation)
Moor (disambiguation)
Moore High School (disambiguation)
Moore Township (disambiguation)
MOR (disambiguation)
Mór (disambiguation)
More (disambiguation)